EUROAPOTHECA is an international group of companies in the Baltics and CEE region managing pharmacy retail chains and wholesale companies in Lithuania, Latvia, Estonia, Sweden and Poland.

EUROAPOTHECA currently owns more than 660 pharmacies in five countries, employs 3.8 thousand employees. EUROAPOTHECA controls pharmacy chain Eurovaistinė  (277 pharmacies) in Lithuania, Apoteksgruppen (192) in Sweden Euroaptieka (55 pharmacies) in Latvia, Euroapteek (76 pharmacies) in Estonia, Euro-Apteka (72 pharmacies) in Poland.

Euroapotheca, the international Group of companies, which brings together pharmacy networks in Lithuania, Latvia, Estonia, Poland and Sweden, successfully expanded its business in 2018. The company increased its scope of business in home markets of the Baltic States and Poland, and implemented strategic development projects, which doubled the business scope of the Group – it purchased pharmacy networks in Sweden and Estonia.

Highlights of the year 2018:

Strategic development towards the North: businesses acquired in Sweden and Estonia
 +86% turnover
 +54.9% online sales
+213 pharmacies
+830 employees

In 2018, Euroapotheca engaged in its active strategic development. In 2018, the Company purchased service organization “Apoteksgruppen i Sverige Holding AB” from the Kingdom of Sweden which provided franchise services to 186 pharmacies operating under the name of “Apoteksgruppen” and owning three pharmacies of its own. The company also acquired 156 pharmacies from private investors in 2018, as well as the right to provide franchise services to 30 independent pharmacies operating under the name “Apoteksgruppen”. In QI 2018, Euroapotheca completed both transactions and became the owner of the fourth largest pharmacy network in Sweden.

In 2018, the subsidiary of Euroapotheca in Estonia “Euroapteek” purchased a network of 13 pharmacies “Ülikooli Apteek” from the Finnish company “Yliopiston Apteekki” and the right to provide all franchise services to another 11 pharmacies. Also, Euroapotheca closed yet another deal in Estonia in 2018 – the Company’s subsidiary in Estonia “Baltfarma” acquired from “Yliopiston Apteekki” the wholesaler of pharmaceuticals “Medapta”.

Euroapotheca invested over EUR 300 million in the transactions in Sweden and Estonia. Due to the changed strategic direction, Euroapotheca sold the retail pharmacy network in Ukraine and left the Ukrainian market in 2018..

Financial results of 2018 – doubled turnover of the Group and a leap towards the largest pharmacy networks in Europe

Having purchased pharmacy networks in Sweden and Estonia in 2018, Euroapotheca Group became the largest pharmacy network in Northern Europe and ranked among the TOP 15 European pharmacy retail groups (in the 11th  place).

In 2018, the turnover of Euroapotheca Group was EUR 682.9 million, i.e. 86% higher than in 2017, when its turnover totalled EUR 367.2 million. Having also included the turnover of franchise-based companies, the turnover of the Group was EUR 738.4 million, which is a 98% increase compared to 2017 (when it was EUR 373 million).

In 2018, the group’s net profit amounted to EUR 17.8 million, i.e. 1.3 million lower than in 2017, when the group’s net profit was EUR 19.1 million. The lower profit was due to investment costs for development.

The audited group performance results of 2018 do not include the turnover of “Apoteksgruppen” and “Ülikooli Apteek” of the first two months, as they were purchased at the end of the first quarter of 2018. According to pre-audited data, after the inclusion of the total turnover of the newly acquired pharmacy network in 2018, it was EUR 740 million as at 31 December 2018.

Turnover grew in the Baltic States and Sweden, and decreased in Poland

The turnover of the Group in Lithuania was EUR 251.5 million, which is a 5% increase compared to 2017, when it totalled EUR 239.4 million. 
In Latvia, the Group’s turnover totalled EUR 57.7 million, and was 4.9% higher than in 2017, when it was EUR 55 million.
Group’s turnover in Estonia was EUR 45.4 million, which is 43% more than in 2017, when it totalled EUR 31.7 million (the result included the turnover of “Ülikooli Apteek” pharmacy network of March – December 2018).
In Poland, the turnover of the Group was EUR 40.5 million, which is 1% lower than in 2017, when turnover totalled EUR 40.9 million (eliminating 9 pharmacies from the network).
Group’s turnover in Sweden totalled EUR 287 million (In March – December 2018, when the network became a part of Euroapotheca Group).
 +55% online sales

The turnover of medicines and other health and beauty products, which Euroapotheca Group sold online (except for prescription drugs, which cannot be sold online in Lithuania), increased by 54.9% in 2018, accounting for 1% in the total pharmacy market of Lithuania (the Group did not provide online sales services in other markets in 2018).

+213 own and franchise pharmacies

At the end of 2018, there were 670 pharmacies in the pharmacy network of the Group, which is 213 pharmacies more (a 46.6% increase) than a year ago. This change was determined by the expansion in Sweden and Estonia (189 new pharmacies in Sweden and 24 – in Estonia).

As at 31 December 2018, Euroapotheca Group had pharmacies in Lithuania – “Eurovaistinė” chain (277 own pharmacies), Poland – “Euro-Apteka” chain (72 pharmacies, of which 65 were own and 7 – franchise pharmacies), Estonia – “Euroapteek” (76 pharmacies, of which 51 were own and 25 franchise pharmacies), Latvia – “Euroaptieka” (55 own pharmacies) and in Sweden – “Apoteksgruppen” chain (192 pharmacies, of which 158 were own and 34 – franchise pharmacies).

+830 employees throughout the Group

There were 3 867 employees in Euroapotheca Group at the end of 2018, which is 830 employees (27.3%) more than at the end of 2017. The number of employees increased as a result of the newly acquired businesses in Sweden and Estonia, as well as their Group-wide integration.

Euroapotheca is an international group of companies operating in the Northern, Central and Eastern Europe, managing retail pharmacy networks and wholesalers in Lithuania, Sweden, Latvia, Estonia and Poland. Euroapotheca operates 670 pharmacies, which serve 40 million customers per year and employs more than 3.8 thousand people. .

EUROAPOTHECA is a member of Vilniaus prekyba, the largest diversified international retail group in Baltics with CEE region.

Current markets
As of 2017, the group has stores in 5 European countries:
 Lithuania: Eurovaistinė, 277 branches
 Sweden: Apoteksgruppen, 192 branches
 Poland: Euro-Apteka, 72 branches
 Latvia: Euroaptieka, 55 branches
 Estonia: Euroapteek, 76 branches

Former stores
 Czech Republic: Eurolekarna, 18 branches
 Slovakia: Eurolekaren, 10 branches
 Ukraine: Euroapteka, 4 branches

References

Pharmacy brands
Multinational companies